Diner Dash 5: Boom! (stylized as Diner Dash 5: BOOM!) is the fifth installment of the Diner Dash series, it also features voice-acting to give more life to the characters. It was developed by PlayFirst and released to the public on March 16, 2010.

Plot
A mysterious figure is lurking around Flo's Diner, removing the word "Fat" from the "Fat-Free Breakfast" banner on the roof using white paint, which makes Flo's Diner look like it's having a free breakfast promo. The next day, Flo and Chef Cookie are surprised by the sign, unfortunately it is too late. As soon as they open the diner, customers start running into and overloading the diner and, as a result, Flo's Diner explodes.

Flo later encounters Mr. Big, who offers to buy her diner. Flo refuses, but Mr. Big blackmails by saying that if the lot is unused in one week, he will buy the diner. One of Flo's customers, Hal the Hungryman, doesn't want to let Mr. Big buy Flo's Diner, and has agreed to rebuild the diner. Flo and Cookie proceed to get a hold of Hal's employees who have been scattered across Dinertown (Avenue Flo, Squid Row, Thyme Square, and Dinertown University).

But then, Flo and Cookie receive the news that Mr. Big has forwarded the deadline. With help from her friends, Flo manages to rebuild the diner just before the deadline. Frustrated at the diner having been finished, Mr. Big challenges Flo by putting signs all over the streets so that the diner will be overloaded once more, but he eventually fails.

In the end, Flo's Diner is back to normal, and it seems Mr. Big will not be bothering Flo and Cookie anymore, as his office is seen in the flash news in ruins thanks to flying balloons rigging the circuits of the office billboard and turning "Free Interest Money Loan" into "Free Money", causing people to rush into the office, overloading and exploding it in the process.

Gameplay
Players can play at 5 different venues, each venue contains 10 story mode levels and after finishing the venue, a bonus level is given to players, in note that the bonus level goal is extremely high, and the shift time is longer than usual. At each venue, players are given a challenge to protect the tables from disasters such as: winds, earthquakes, rains, and fuse box problems. However, these disasters can be avoided by buying the upgrades available in the upgrade shop.

Unlike the previous Diner Dash games, players can purchase upgrades during the start of a level. These upgrades can be bought using the money earned in the previous shift. Some upgrades are permanent (example: faster chef, faster shoes, and disaster protection), but some are just for one level and are more expensive than other upgrades (example: podium helper, salad bar helper, and extra hands).

Players can also customize the diner and the venues, the venues can be customized at several levels, there are four different items to be customized, after choosing which item to be customized, players can choose one of several different venue upgrades, in the end all four of customizer options will be finished and the player is awarded with a venue medal. The Diner can also be customized, unlike venue customizer, the Diner customizer objects will unlock one by one by finishing levels.

Players can also enjoy an all new customer: Townies. Townies are one of Flo's customers that don't have any patience. They come in many different forms, they can become a regular customer by dragging them to the correct group, granting the player bonus points. There's also a challenge where players have to drag Hal the Hungryman to a disaster table, where he must fix a problem for the customer, after which the player will earn bonus points.

Several new customers are introduced. They are as follows:

Lawyers: Seat them adjacent to another table with Lawyers, and they will start arguing very loudly. Lawyers are very impatient but tip very well if they leave happy.

Librarians: They will keep noisy customers in nearby tables quiet for a limited time. Librarians are patient and tip okay.

Clowns: They will sometimes start juggling, which will mesmerize nearby customers, making them stop eating. Click the Clowns to make them stop juggling. They are patient and tip well.

References 

2010 video games
MacOS games
Video games about food and drink
Video games developed in the United States
Video games featuring female protagonists
Video games scored by Adam Gubman
Windows games
Strategy video games
Games built with Playground SDK
PlayFirst games